Tegorhynchus is a genus of worms belonging to the family Illiosentidae.

The species of this genus are found in Northern America.

Species:

Tegorhynchus africanus 
Tegorhynchus africanus 
Tegorhynchus brevis 
Tegorhynchus cetratus 
Tegorhynchus edmondsi 
Tegorhynchus furcatus 
Tegorhynchus holospinosus 
Tegorhynchus holospinus 
Tegorhynchus multacanthus

References

Illiosentidae
Acanthocephala genera